Lilacs for voice and orchestra (or Lilacs) is a musical composition by George T. Walker Jr. (1922–2018) that was awarded the 1996 Pulitzer Prize for Music.  The work, scored for soprano soloist and orchestra, was the unanimous choice of the Pulitzer prize jury. Walker was the first African-American composer to be awarded the prize.

Walker set the 1865 poem, "When Lilacs Last in the Dooryard Bloom'd", by poet Walt Whitman.  Whitman wrote the poem as an elegy to President Abraham Lincoln after his death on 15 April 1865.  The composition was premiered by the Boston Symphony Orchestra and Faye Robinson on February 1, 1996. "The unanimous choice of the Music Jury, this passionate, and very American, musical composition...has a beautiful and evocative lyrical quality using words of Walt Whitman."

Sources

Further reading
(Apr 27, 1996). Billboard, Vol. 108, No. 17, p. 42. ISSN 0006-2510.

Compositions by George Walker
Pulitzer Prize for Music-winning works
Musical settings of poems by Walt Whitman